Asterivora homotypa is a species of moth of the family Choreutidae. It is found in subalpine and alpine habitats in Australia. Adult moths have brown forewings, each with various white markings including two vague transverse white speckled bars. Their hindwings are brown, each with a vague white wiggly submarginal line. Their wingspan length is approximately 1 centimetre.

References

External links
Australian Faunal Directory
Image at choreutidae.lifedesks.org

Asterivora
Moths of Australia
Moths described in 1907